Nesiarchus nasutus, the Black gemfish, is a species of snake mackerel found in tropical and subtropical waters in most parts of the world, though not in east Pacific and north Indian waters.  It occurs at depths of from  though they make diel vertical migrations from benthopelagic to mesopelagic depths at night.  This species can reach a length of  SL though most do not exceed  SL.  It is of minor importance to local commercial fisheries.  This species is currently the only known member of its genus, Nesiarchus. That genus is thus considered monotypic.

References

Mackerels
Gempylidae
Fish described in 1862
Monotypic fish genera
Taxa named by James Yate Johnson